Skorki  is a village in the administrative district of Gmina Somianka, within Wyszków County, Masovian Voivodeship, in east-central Poland.

References

Skorki

pl:Skorki